The canton of Plestin-les-Grèves is an administrative division of the Côtes-d'Armor department, northwestern France. Its borders were modified at the French canton reorganisation which came into effect in March 2015. Its seat is in Plestin-les-Grèves.

It consists of the following communes:
 
Lanvellec
Loguivy-Plougras
Plestin-les-Grèves
Plouaret
Ploubezre
Plougras
Ploumilliau
Plounérin
Plounévez-Moëdec
Plouzélambre
Plufur
Saint-Michel-en-Grève
Trédrez-Locquémeau
Tréduder
Trégrom
Trémel
Le Vieux-Marché

References

Cantons of Côtes-d'Armor